Quentin Halys and Tristan Lamasine were the defending champions but chose not to defend their title.

Hugo Nys and Tim Pütz won the title after defeating Alejandro González and Jaume Munar in the final 6–2, 6–2.

Seeds

Draw

References
 Main Draw

BNP Paribas de Nouvelle-Caledonie - Doubles
2018 Doubles